The Fort Selkirk volcanic field is a monogenetic volcanic field in the Northern Cordilleran Volcanic Province, Yukon Territory, Canada. It is the northernmost Holocene age volcanic field in Canada, located close to the connection of the Yukon and Pelly rivers. The youngest eruptions within the field are unknown. However, the youngest volcano Volcano Mountain produced lava flows that appear to be only a few hundred years old.

See also
Volcanism in Canada
List of Northern Cordilleran volcanoes
List of volcanoes in Canada

References

Northern Cordilleran Volcanic Province
Volcanic fields of Canada
Quaternary volcanism